Corynanthine, also known as rauhimbine, is an alkaloid found in the Rauvolfia and Corynanthe (including Pausinystalia) genera of plants. It is one of the two diastereoisomers of yohimbine, the other being rauwolscine. It is also related to ajmalicine.

Corynanthine acts as an α1-adrenergic and α2-adrenergic receptor antagonist with approximately 10-fold selectivity for the former site over the latter. This is in contrast to yohimbine and rauwolscine which have around 30-fold higher affinity for the α2-adrenergic receptor over the α1-adrenergic receptor. As a result, corynanthine is not a stimulant (or an aphrodisiac for that matter), but a depressant, and likely plays a role in the antihypertensive properties of Rauvolfia extracts. Like yohimbine and rauwolscine, corynanthine has also been shown to possess some activity at serotonin receptors.

See also
 Ajmalicine
 Rauwolscine
 Spegatrine
 Yohimbine

References

Alkaloids found in Rauvolfia
Alpha-1 blockers
Alpha-2 blockers
Antihypertensive agents
Tryptamine alkaloids
Indoloquinolizines
Quinolizidine alkaloids